Champion Versions is the debut EP by the Beta Band, originally released in 1997 on 12" vinyl only. The EP consists of songs featured on the original demo tape the band had sent to Phil Brown, an A&R rep for EMI, which landed the group a record deal with Regal Records. It was later included in its entirety on the 1998 compilation The Three E.P.'s, along with The Patty Patty Sound and Los Amigos del Beta Bandidos. It is the only Beta Band recording to feature founding members Gordon Anderson and Steve Duffield, who both left shortly before its release.

Champion Versions, along with the other two original EPs from the Beta Band, long out of print on vinyl, were re-issued as part of Record Store Day 2013.

The cover of the EP references the design of King Tubby's The Roots of Dub LP, whilst the images are lifted from a box of Clac-Doigt-brand miniature fireworks.

"Dry the Rain" ranked at number 57 in Pitchfork Media's list of the Top 200 Songs of the 1990s.

Track listing
Side A:
 "Dry the Rain" – 6:05
 "I Know" – 3:58

Side B:
 "B + A" – 6:35
 "Dogs Got a Bone" – 5:58

References

The Beta Band albums
1997 debut EPs